Hasanabad-e Qadamgah (also Romanized as Ḩasanābād-e Qadamgāh; also known as Ḩasanābād, Ḩassanābād, and Qadamgāh) is a village in Shurab Rural District, in the Central District of Arsanjan County, Fars Province, Iran. At the 2006 census, its population was 131, in 26 families.

References 

Populated places in Arsanjan County